Geumchon Station is a railway station of the Gyeongui Line and Gyeongui-Jungang Line in Geumchon-dong, Paju, Gyeonggi-do, South Korea.

History
 April 4, 1906: Opened as a regular station.
 April 22, 2008: All services move to the new location.
 October 19, 2008: The old station demolished
 July 1, 2009: The station became a part of Seoul Metropolitan Subway

Station Layout

Gallery

External links

 Station information from Korail

Seoul Metropolitan Subway stations
Railway stations opened in 1906
Metro stations in Paju
1906 establishments in Korea